is a 2006 manic shooter by Cave released for Japanese arcades. It was released for the Xbox 360 in 2011.

Pink Sweets is the sequel to the 2005 game Ibara.

Gameplay

The game has heavy Raizing influences.

Pink Sweets is the sequel to Ibara, and features the stage 1-5 bosses from Ibara as playable characters.

Players get to pilot the gals and use a barrier/shot system to defeat flitting enemies as well as end-level bosses of the pastel-colored type. Enemies besides bosses are named after food. During the game, the gals yelp and intonate various sayings to steel themselves for battle.

Plot
In Pink Sweets, the sixth and final Guardian in Ibara, did not die. Neither did any of the Rose sisters. Instead, they shifted from the dark side to the light.

Development 
Programmer Shinobu Yagawa worked on this game, and he had previously worked on the games Recca , Battle Garegga, and Ibara.

Release 
It was released in Japanese arcades on April 21, 2006.

Pink Sweets was released on Xbox 360 in a bundle pack with Muchi Muchi Pork! in 2011 entitled .

Reception
Famitsu magazine awarded the compilation a score of 24/40 based on four reviews (6/6/6/6).

References

External links
 

2006 video games
Arcade video games
Cave (company) games
Cooperative video games
Japan-exclusive video games
Multiplayer and single-player video games
Scrolling shooters
Steampunk video games
Video games developed in Japan
Video games featuring female protagonists
Muchi Muchi Pork! and Pink Sweets